Gyliano Mauritzio Marvin van Velzen (born 14 April 1994) is a Dutch professional footballer who plays as a winger for Cypriot club Peyia 2014. Born in Amsterdam, he began his career with Ajax before moving to English club Manchester United as a 16-year-old in 2010. However, he failed to break into the Manchester United first team and after a loan spell with Belgian club Royal Antwerp, he returned to the Netherlands with Utrecht.

Club career

Early career
Van Velzen began his career at Ajax at the age of 13, coming through the ranks at the club, but was not offered a professional contract.

Manchester United
In November 2010, he was signed by Manchester United and was placed into the Manchester United reserve team, where he spent two years, before being promoted to the senior squad. In August 2012, Van Velzen signed a professional contract with the club.

Loan to Royal Antwerp 
On 31 August 2012, Van Velzen was loaned out to Royal Antwerp. He made his league debut on 15 September 2012, in a 1–1 home draw against Mouscron-Péruwelz. He scored his first goal in a 2–0 win against Brussels. He returned to Manchester United on 2 January 2013.

Utrecht
In the summer of 2013, Van Velzen was released by Manchester United. On 6 August 2013, Dutch club FC Utrecht signed him for three seasons. He made his debut on 6 October in a 3–0 league defeat against Ajax.

Volendam
On 9 June 2015, it was announced that Van Velzen had signed a two-year contract with Eerste Divisie side FC Volendam. He made 52 league appearances for the club, scoring six times. Van Velzen made his league debut for Volendam on 7 August 2015 in a 4-1 away win over NAC Breda. He scored his first goal on 18 September 2015 in a 2-0 away win against Helmond Sport. The goal was the second of the game and came in the 76th minute.

Roda JC Kerkrade
On 30 January 2017, Van Velzen signed a two-and-a-half-year deal with Eredivisie side Roda JC Kerkrade.

Crawley Town
On 5 September 2019, Van Velzen signed a two-year deal with EFL League Two side Crawley Town. He joined National League side Aldershot Town on loan on 22 February 2020. On 2 September 2020, Van Velzen left Crawley Town via mutual consent, after one year with the English club.

Telstar
He signed with Dutch Eerste Divisie side SC Telstar in September 2020 on a two-year contract.

International career
Van Velzen is of Surinamese descent and is eligible to play for the Netherlands or Suriname at international level.

Career statistics

Club

International

References

External links
 
 U15U16U17 Netherlands profiles at Ons Oranje
 

1994 births
Living people
Footballers from Amsterdam
Dutch footballers
Dutch expatriate footballers
Netherlands youth international footballers
Netherlands under-21 international footballers
Dutch sportspeople of Surinamese descent
Association football midfielders
Manchester United F.C. players
Royal Antwerp F.C. players
FC Utrecht players
FC Volendam players
Roda JC Kerkrade players
Crawley Town F.C. players
Aldershot Town F.C. players
SC Telstar players
Challenger Pro League players
Eredivisie players
Eerste Divisie players
English Football League players
National League (English football) players
Dutch expatriate sportspeople in England
Dutch expatriate sportspeople in Belgium
Expatriate footballers in England
Expatriate footballers in Belgium